"Musique Non Stop" is a 1986 single by German techno group Kraftwerk, which was featured on the album Electric Café. It was re-released as a remix on their 1991 album The Mix. The single was their first number one on Billboard Hot Dance Club Play and was one of two songs to make it to number one there.

Background and composition
"Musique Non Stop"s lyrics comprise the title of the song being repeatedly chanted by a female voice, which is the voice of the music video's animation artist Rebecca Allen, in English and a computerized male voice in French.

The single is traditionally the final act during Kraftwerk concerts. In the early 1990s, a completely different version of "Musique Non-Stop" – slower and more melodic – was used extensively as a jingle on MTV Europe. Earlier, MTV Europe had already included elements from the original song and the video in the title graphics for MTV's Greatest Hits. This version was later released in December 2020 as "Non Stop" on Remixes, a compilation released by Parlophone.

Live performances 
After Florian Schneider left the band in 2008, the song was altered to accommodate video technician Stefan Pfaffe during performances. The song is basically the same, except shorter and the percussive/harmonic sequence that occupied Schneider's solo is operated by the other band members.

The Mix version (which was used in Minimum-Maximum) incorporates elements from fellow Electric Café songs "Boing Boom Tschak" and "Techno Pop". This was also done in Musique Non Stop's single version and music video.

Music video
The video for "Musique Non-Stop" is notable in itself for showcasing a computer animated representation of the band. Created in 1983, it sat dormant for three years before finally being incorporated as the video for the song. The animation, which was complex for its time, was created by Rebecca Allen, using state-of-the-art facial animation software developed by the New York Institute of Technology. The slow rate of the album's progress, combined with rapid changes in software animation, meant that Allen had to archive the animation program developed at the Institute of Technology until Hütter and Schneider were ready in 1986, to travel to New York to edit the images to the final version of "Musique Non-Stop".

Track listing

7-inch single

12-inch single

Charts

Weekly charts

Year-end charts

References

1986 singles
Kraftwerk songs
Songs written by Ralf Hütter
Songs written by Florian Schneider
Songs written by Karl Bartos
1986 songs
EMI Records singles